The 2011 Asian Karate Championships are the 10th edition of the Senior Asian Karate Championships and 11th edition of the Cadet, Junior & U21 Asian Karate Championships and were held in Haixia Sports Center, Quanzhou, China from July 21 to July 24, 2011.

Medalists

Men

Women

Medal table

References
 Results

External links
 akf-karatedo.com

Asian Championships
Asian Karate Championships
Asian Karate Championships
Karate Championships